Henry Kraus (November 13, 1905 in Knoxville, Tennessee – January 27, 1995 in Paris) was a labor historian, and European art historian.

He graduated from the University of Chicago and Western Reserve University with a master's degree in 1928.
He was an organizer of the Flint Sit-Down Strike, and edited The Flint Auto Worker.
Sol Dollinger was critical of his account of the strike.

He married Dorothy Kraus, who helped organize the UAW Women's Auxiliary.
He was the first editor of the United Automobile Workers' newspaper, The United Auto Worker.
He moved to Paris, and worked as a European correspondent for World Wide Medical News Service.
His papers are at the Walter P. Reuther Library, Wayne State University.

Awards
 1984 MacArthur Fellows Program

Archival Collections
The Henry Kraus Papers at the Walter P. Reuther Library date from 1926-1960. His papers reflect his attempts to organize auto workers and the early history of the United Automobile Workers from 1935-1941. Particularly well-documented in the collection are the Flint sit-down strike and factionalism within the UAW.

Works
Heroes of Unwritten Story, University of Illinois Press, 1994, 
The Many and the Few, University of Illinois Press, 1947, 
The Living Theater of Medieval Art, Indiana University Press, 1967 (reprint University of Pennsylvania Press, 1972)
Hidden World of Misericords, Authors Dorothy Kraus, Henry Kraus, Joseph, 1976, 
Gothic Stalls of Spain, Authors Dorothy Kraus, Henry Kraus, Routledge, 1986, 
Gold Was the Mortar: The Economics of Cathedral Building. Routledge & Kegan Paul, 1979,

References

External links
"Kraus", University of Michigan-Flint Labor History Project

1905 births
1995 deaths
University of Chicago alumni
Case Western Reserve University alumni
Labor historians
20th-century American historians
20th-century American male writers
MacArthur Fellows
American male non-fiction writers